Courtenay was a parliamentary electorate in Canterbury, New Zealand from 1902 to 1908. The electorate was represented by one Member of Parliament, Charles Lewis.

Population centres
The Representation Act 1900 had increased the membership of the House of Representatives from general electorates 70 to 76, and this was implemented through the 1902 electoral redistribution. In 1902, changes to the country quota affected the three-member electorates in the four main centres. The tolerance between electorates was increased to ±1,250 so that the Representation Commissions (since 1896, there had been separate commissions for the North and South Islands) could take greater account of communities of interest. These changes proved very disruptive to existing boundaries, and six electorates were established for the first time, including Courtenay, and two electorates that previously existed were re-established.

The Courtenay electorate was based on the Canterbury area of Kirwee and Courtenay. The settlement of Courtenay on the south bank of the Waimakariri River dates from the 1850s.

In the 1907 electoral redistribution, a major change that had to be allowed for was a reduction of the tolerance to ±750 to those electorates where the country quota applied. The North Island had once again a higher population growth than the South Island, and three seats were transferred from south to north. In the resulting boundary distribution, every existing electorate was affected, and some were abolished, including the Courtenay electorate.

History

Members of Parliament
Courtenay was represented by one Member of Parliament:

Key

Notes

References

External links
Courtenay in the Cyclopaedia of New Zealand, 1903

Historical electorates of New Zealand
1902 establishments in New Zealand
1908 disestablishments in New Zealand